In the Government of Australia, the Minister for Defence Industry is currently the Hon Pat Conroy MP since 1 June 2022, following the Australian federal election in 2022.

The Minister for Defence Industry, or previously the Minister of Supply, is a ministerial portfolio that has existed variously since 1939. The Minister appointed is responsible for oversight of defence procurement, financial management, project and sustainment management, materiel engineering, and materiel logistics. The minister aims to ensure that the Australian Defence Force is equipped and supplied with the requirements as identified and approved by Government. The minister administers the portfolio through the Capability Acquisition and Sustainment Group of the Department of Defence.

While ultimately responsible to the Commonwealth of Australia and the Parliament, in practical terms, the minister reports to the Minister for Defence.

List of ministers for defence industry
A minister is appointed with responsibility for oversight of defence procurement, financial management, project and sustainment management, materiel engineering, and materiel logistics to ensure the Australian Defence Force is equipped and supplied with the requirements as identified and approved by Government.

The following individuals have been appointed Minister for Defence Industry, or any of its precedent titles:

Notes

Ministers for Munitions
The following individuals have been appointed Minister for Munitions:

Ministers for Defence Production
The following individuals have been appointed Minister for Defence Production, or any of its precedent titles:

See also
 Department of Defence (Australia)
 Minister for Defence (Australia)
 Minister for Defence Science and Personnel (Australia)
 Minister for Veterans' Affairs (Australia)
 Defence industry of Australia

References

External links
 

Defence Materiel